Shachong Station, formerly Fangcun Dadao Station when planning, is a station on the Guangfo Metro. It is located at the underground of the junction of Huanhua Road and Fangcun Avenue East in Fangcun, Liwan District, Guangzhou. It entered operation on December 28, 2015.

Station layout

Exits

References

Guangzhou Metro stations in Liwan District
Foshan Metro stations
Railway stations in China opened in 2015